Manija is a village in Pärnu, Pärnu County in Estonia. It is located on the island of Manilaid in the Gulf of Riga.

References

Villages in Pärnu County